Giovanni Battista Santorio or Giovan Battista Santoro (died 29 February 1592) was a Roman Catholic prelate who served as Bishop of Tricarico (1586–1592) and Bishop of Alife (1586–1592).

Biography
On 19 November 1568, Giovanni Battista Santorio was appointed during the papacy of Pope Pius V as Bishop of Alife.
 
On 13 December 1568, he was consecrated bishop by Giulio Antonio Santorio, Archbishop of Santa Severina, with Felice Peretti Montalto, Bishop of Sant'Agata de' Goti, and Umberto Locati, Bishop of Bagnoregio, serving as co-consecrators. 
On 8 January 1586, he was appointed during the papacy of Pope Sixtus V as Bishop of Tricarico.
He served as Bishop of Tricarico until his death on 29 February 1592.

Episcopal succession

See also 
Catholic Church in Italy

References

External links and additional sources
 (for Chronology of Bishops) 
 (for Chronology of Bishops) 
 (for Chronology of Bishops) 
 (for Chronology of Bishops) 

16th-century Italian Roman Catholic bishops
Bishops appointed by Pope Pius V
Bishops appointed by Pope Sixtus V
1592 deaths